Cyperus laxus is a sedge species in the  Cyperaceae. It is native to tropical regions of the Western Hemisphere (from central Mexico and the West Indies south to Argentina) and also to Africa (from Liberia to Zimbabwe and Tanzania). The species is reportedly naturalized in Assam and the Andaman and Nicobar Islands.

Subspecies
Three subspecies are recognized:

Cyperus laxus subsp. buchholzii (Boeckeler) Lye - western and central Africa
Cyperus laxus subsp. laxus - Western Hemisphere; naturalized in India
Cyperus laxus subsp. sylvestris (Ridl.) Lye - Tanzania, Uganda, Zimbabwe

See also
List of Cyperus species

References

External links 
 

laxus
Plants described in 1791
Flora of Africa
Flora of Mexico
Flora of Central America
Flora of the Caribbean
Flora of South America